The Belgian Bowl IX was played in 1996 and was won by the Tournai Cardinals.

References

External links
Official Belgian Bowl website

American football in Belgium
Belgian Bowl
Belgian Bowl